is a Japanese manga series written and illustrated by Kotoyama. It was serialized in Shogakukan's shōnen manga magazine Weekly Shōnen Sunday from June 2014 to April 2018 and has been collected into eleven tankōbon volumes. A light novel adaptation titled Dagashi Kashi: Mō Hitotsu no Natsu Yasumi, written and illustrated by Manta Aisora, was published in a single volume by Shogakukan in December 2015 under their Gagaga Bunko imprint.

An anime television series adaptation by Feel aired in Japan from January to March 2016. A second season by Tezuka Productions aired from January to March 2018. This series is licensed by Crunchyroll in the English-speaking regions.

Plot
Shikada Dagashi, a countryside shop selling cheap candy and snacks ("dagashi") has been run by the Shikada family for nine generations, but Kokonotsu does not want to take over the shop from his father, Yō, instead aiming to become a manga artist. Hotaru Shidare visits the shop one day hoping to recruit Yō to her family's company, the sweets manufacturer Shidare Corporation, but Yō refuses unless Hotaru first can convince Kokonotsu to take over Shikada Dagashi.

Characters

An eccentric girl who is very passionate about sweets and snacks. Her father owns a famous snacks company and she came to Shikada store to recruit Yō as their company's planned shop chain's manager. As Yō will not leave as long as Kokonotsu is unwilling to succeed him as Shikada storekeeper, she quickly strikes a deal with him: she will convince Kokonotsu to take over the store in return for his employment. From then on she tries to persuade Kokonotsu using many different ways such as games, stories, and riddles. She is not good at chance games, so uses her other skills to make Kokonotsu consider taking over the shop. In the final chapter, she asks Kokonotsu if he wants to marry her. The relationship between them remains ambiguous.

Kokonotsu (also known as Coconuts) and his father Yō live in a countryside town where they run a small sweets store. He aspires to be a manga artist, an ambition that puts him at odds with his father who wants him to inherit the store which has been run by the family for eight generations. He constantly finds himself manning the cash register, more often than not a result of his father's trickery. After Hotaru's arrival, he also has to put up with her antics as well. He is nicknamed . His given name is a Kun'yomi pronunciation of the Japanese numeral , ; it works as a pun, referring to his being the ninth generation of the family that will run the store. At the final chapter, he got confessed by Hotaru and was going to give her an answer once she is back. However, their relationship remains ambiguous after she came back.

Kokonotsu's classmate and childhood friend, who runs a nearby cafe with her older twin brother Tō. She has a longstanding crush on Kokonotsu. At first alarmed by Hotaru's presence, she quickly befriends her, as their goals are aligned: Hotaru wishes Kokonotsu to run the store while she wants him to keep staying in town. Saya has a hidden talent of toy mastery like what she did with ohajiki; at one point she defeats a well-prepared Hotaru at a Menko game, an event that leads Hotaru to start addressing her with suffix  (Master in Funimation dub), an antiquated designation used by disciples to their masters.

Older twin brother of Saya and a good friend of Kokonotsu. A laid back person who usually wears a Hawaiian shirt and sunglasses. He and Saya run a cafe named "Cafe Endō". His antics usually earns the wrath of his twin sister Saya, ending with a bruised face and broken sunglasses.

Kokonotsu's father as well as the current owner of Shikada store. He is desperate to make his son the 9th head of the shop so that his legacy will continue. He agrees to Hotaru's bargain that if she can convince his son to be the next head of his shop, he would start working for Hotaru's company as the company's planned dagashi shop chain manager.

 
An intelligent woman who has trouble keeping a job due to her laziness and other personality quirks. She ends up working at Shikada Dagashi in exchange for room and board.

 
Hotaru's older brother and the manager of the local convenience store that recently opened across from Shikada Dagashi. Beni finds dagashi shops too old fashioned. He considers Kokonotsu virtuous and his rival, after he comments on how the stores overpriced cakes wouldn't sell, and recommended selling dagashi aimed at children and adults who would easily buy them.

An old acquaintance of Yō Shikada who runs an okonomiyaki shop.

Media

Manga
Dagashi Kashi, written and illustrated by Kotoyama, was serialized in Shogakukan's shōnen manga magazine Weekly Shōnen Sunday from June 25, 2014 to April 11, 2018. The series was collected into eleven tankōbon volumes published by Shogakukan from September 18, 2014 to May 18, 2018.

Volume list

Light novel
A light novel adaptation titled Dagashi Kashi: Mō Hitotsu no Natsu Yasumi, written and illustrated by Manta Aisora, was published in a single volume by Shogakukan on December 18, 2015 under their Gagaga Bunko imprint.

Anime

A 12-episode anime adaptation aired from January 7 to March 31, 2016. It was produced by Feel, and was directed by Shigehito Takayanagi, who also handled the series composition together with Yasuko Kamo. Kanetoshi Kamimoto was in charge of character design, and Satoshi Motoyama was the series' sound director. The series' opening theme is "Checkmate!?" by Michi, while the ending theme is "Hey Caloric Queen" by Ayana Taketatsu.

A second season, Dagashi Kashi 2, aired from January 12 to March 30, 2018, on TBS, and aired on Sun TV and BS-TBS. For Dagashi Kashi 2, Tezuka Productions took over the series production, with Feel instead being credited for setting cooperation. While Motoyama returned as sound director, several other duties were taken over by new staff: Satoshi Kuwabara directed the season, Mayumi Morita handled the series composition, Nana Miura designed the characters, and Michiko Yokote wrote the script. The voice cast from the first season reprised their roles, and was joined by Chinatsu Akasaki, who voiced the new character Hajime Owari, and Tomokazu Sugita, who voiced Yutaka Beni. Dagashi Kashi 2 aired in a shared half-hour time slot together with Takunomi., both of which consist of fifteen-minute episodes. Like its first season, Dagashi Kashi 2 lasted for 12 episodes.

Reception
Dagashi Kashi ranked #5 on the "Nationwide Bookstore Employees' Recommended Comics" by the Honya Club website in 2016. The series was nominated for the 41st Kodansha Manga Awards in 2017, in the "best shōnen manga" category.

Sales
In September 2015, when the anime adaptation was announced, the two manga volumes that were released at the time had sold a 450,000 copies combined; when the fourth volume came out in December 2015, sales had risen to a total of 1.2 million copies. By the time the anime premiered in January 2016, the manga has 1.6 million copies in print, doubling the average number of copies sold per volumes compared to before the anime announcement, to 400,000 copies per volume. The manga had over 3 million copies in print as of April, 2018.

See also
 Call of the Night, another manga series by the same author

Notes

References

External links
 

2015 Japanese novels
Anime series based on manga
Confectionery in fiction
Cooking in anime and manga
Feel (animation studio)
Funimation
Gagaga Bunko
Light novels
Romantic comedy anime and manga
Shogakukan franchises
Shogakukan manga
Shōnen manga
Slice of life anime and manga
Tezuka Productions
TBS Television (Japan) original programming